Hopewell is an unincorporated community in Greene County, Arkansas, United States.

References

Unincorporated communities in Greene County, Arkansas
Unincorporated communities in Arkansas